Jacob "Bugs" Reisigl (December 12, 1887 – February 24, 1957) was a Major League Baseball pitcher who played for one season. He pitched in two games for the Cleveland Naps during the 1911 Cleveland Naps season.

External links

1887 births
1957 deaths
Major League Baseball pitchers
Cleveland Naps players
Baseball players from New York (state)
New Haven Black Crows players
New Haven Prairie Hens players
New Haven Murlins players
Providence Grays (minor league) players
Chattanooga Lookouts players
Topeka Jayhawks players
San Francisco Seals (baseball) players
Salt Lake City Bees players